Savigny-en-Sancerre is a commune in the Cher department in the Centre-Val de Loire region of France.

Geography
The commune is the source of many small rivers.

Population

Sights
 The church of St. Symphorien, dating from the twelfth century.
 The fifteenth-century chapel in the cemetery.

See also
Communes of the Cher department

References

Communes of Cher (department)